Khalifa is a Muslim community of Gujarat in India and Sindh in Pakistan. Their traditional occupation is usually as folk singers or musicians. Most Khaliphas are Sunni Muslims. They form one of the sub-groups of the Gujarati Muslims.

There  are an emigrant communities in South Africa, the United Kingdom and fewer  members in Mozambique and East Africa.
 
In South Africa the original attaks (clans) present include the Mover("more-wahr") who hail from the village of Matwa(Jamnagar area), the Murass, the Ghara, the Ladharr, the Wantra, Sanjee and the Juneja. Marriage has not been exclusively within the jamaat. i.e. intermarriage with Urdu, Surti, Memon and Cape Malay communities of South Africa has occurred. Some members of the community have identified themselves as members of the Memon community. Most are aware that they are not Memon.
 
There is a degree of identity confusion in younger members of the South African community because of language spoken or mixed parentage. Kacchi language/dialect  and Gujarati are spoken by older members in South Africa. Kacchi is usually of the Memon variety  which is prevalent in the country and Gujarati of a Kathiawari variety. Surti Gujarati is predominant among the Muslim Gujarati community.
 
In London Kacchi is spoken as there is a larger Kacchi speaking community. Gujarati is the written language and the language of status and education hence some families choosing to speak the language. Also the language spoken by ancestors in India was carried to the new homeland. The younger generation understands but is not fluent. English is the primary language in South Africa.
 
There is an indication that their ancestors come from the Sindh. There is even a story  of a migration to the subcontinent with or the conversion at the hands of a certain Shah Jalal. The male ancestors apparently married Indian women.
 
Caste occupation was being barbers.

Tharmuhammad Nathoo  wrote a little Gujarati booklet in Tongaat, South Africa, about his community in the last century. His grandson, Aziz Hassim, has written an award-winning book, The Lotus People, about life in the Indian experience in Durban, South Africa.

Social groups of Pakistan
Muslim communities of India
Social groups of Gujarat
Muslim communities of Gujarat